Dominic Chad (born 5 June 1972 in Exeter, Devon, England) is an English musician, formerly the lead guitarist, backing vocalist, arranger and co-writer of the rock band Mansun.

Biography

Early days
Born in Exeter, Devon, Chad grew up in Maidstone, Kent where he attended Maidstone Grammar School. Dominic went on to study French and Russian at Bangor University, where he met bassist Mark Howard. They formed the band "Floating Bear" in 1991 with Lance Paine, Pete James and Iain Jenner and released a five-track cassette entitled "Barely Real". The band regularly played at the university's student bar including an Amnesty benefit gig, and also played at Pontardawe Festival.

Mansun
After being kicked off his degree at the end of the second year, Chad re-located to Chester where he worked as a barman at the Fat Cat Cafe Bar on Watergate Street and met Stove King and Paul Draper, with whom he formed Mansun. Whilst in Mansun, Chad worked as an arranger and songwriter, and co-wrote several of Mansun's songs with Draper as well as writing and performing a number of B-sides himself. He also took lead vocals on some of Mansun's songs, such as "Golden Stone", a B-side to "I Can Only Disappoint U" and a live cover of the Magazine single "Shot by Both Sides".

After nearly eight years together, Mansun broke up in 2003 whilst working on their fourth studio album.

Post-Mansun career
Chad has since gone on to work as a support worker, supporting people with learning difficulties, physical disabilities and brain injuries. From 2005 to 2010, he worked as an ambulance medic in the London Ambulance Service. Chad studied at the Oxford School of Sports Massage completing their Level 5 BTEC diploma, and also works as a therapist. He also volunteers as a RNLI Lifeboat Crew member in his spare time and in 2016 participated in Team Trailtriker, "4 women and 4 men from the UK aiming to raise as much money for Oxfam whilst raising awareness of those battling cancer and widening awareness of a rare illness called POEMS Syndrome".

Chad also composed and performed the music for the short film The Man on the Moor, directed by his friend Steven Rosam. He has also written and co-written episodes for Wussywat The Clumsy Cat, a children's TV show screened on CBeebies from June 2015.

As of 2019, Chad is working as an area manager with people who have learning difficulties.

List of Mansun songs composed by Dominic Chad
Composed alone

Composed with Paul Draper (and others)

References

1972 births
Living people
English rock guitarists
English male guitarists
English male singers
English songwriters
People from Maidstone
Musicians from Kent
21st-century English singers
21st-century British guitarists
21st-century British male singers
British male songwriters
Alumni of Bangor University